

R 

 2100 Ra-Shalom
 3184 Raab
 
 
 
 
 5040 Rabinowitz
 
 
 
 
 
 
 
 
 674 Rachele
 
 
 
 
 
 
 
 
 
 
 
 
 
 
 
 
 
 
 
 
 
 
 
 
 
 
 
 
 
 
 
 
 
 
 
 
 
 
 1644 Rafita
 
 
 
 
 
 
 
 
 
 
 
 
 
 
 
 
 
 
 1450 Raimonda
 
 
 
 
 
 
 
 
 
 1137 Raïssa
 
 
 
 
 
 
 12374 Rakhat
 
 
 
 
 
 
 
 
 
 
 
 
 
 
 
 
 
 
 
 
 
 
 
 
 
 
 
 
 
 
 
 
 
 
 110393 Rammstein
 
 
 
 
 
 
 
 
 
 
 
 
 
 
 
 
 
 
 
 
 
 
 
 
 
 
 
 
 
 
 
 
 
 
 1530 Rantaseppä
 
 
 
 
 
 708 Raphaela
 
 
 
 
 
 1148 Rarahu
 
 
 
 
 
 
 
 
 
 
 927 Ratisbona
 
 
 
 
 8661 Ratzinger
 
 
 
 
 
 
 9165 Raup
 
 
 
 
 
 
 
 
 
 
 
 
 
 
 
 
 
 
 
 22740 Rayleigh
 
 
 
 
 
 
 
 
 
 
 
 3790 Raywilson
 
 
 
 
 
 
 
 
 
 
 
 
 
 
 572 Rebekka
 
 
 
 
 
 573 Recha
 
 30718 Records
 
 
 
 
 
 
 
 4587 Rees
 
 
 
 
 
 
 
 
 285 Regina
 
 
 
 
 574 Reginhild
 1117 Reginita
 
 
 
 
 
 
 
 
 
 
 
 
 
 
 
 
 
 
 
 
 
 
 
 
 1111 Reinmuthia
 
 
 
 
 
 
 
 
 
 
 
 
 
 
 
 
 
 
 
 
 
 
 
 
 575 Renate
 1416 Renauxa
 
 
 
 
 
 
 31249 Renéefleming
 
 
 
 
 
 
 
 
 
 
 
 
 
 1204 Renzia
 
 
 
 906 Repsolda
 
 
 
 1081 Reseda
 
 
 
 
 
 
 
 
 
 1096 Reunerta
 
 
 
 
 
 
 
 
 
 
 
 
 528 Rezia
 
 38083 Rhadamanthus
 
 
 577 Rhea
 
 
 6070 Rheinland
 
 9142 Rhesus
 
 
 
 
 
 
 
 
 
 907 Rhoda
 
 1197 Rhodesia
 437 Rhodia
 166 Rhodope
 5258 Rhoeo
 
 
 
 
 
 
 
 879 Ricarda
 
 
 
 
 
 
 
 1230 Riceia
 
 
 
 
 
 
 
 
 
 
 
 
 
 
 
 
 
 
 
 
 
 
 
 
 
 
 
 
 
 
 
 
 1214 Richilde
 
 
 
 
 
 
 
 
 
 
 
 
 
 9983 Rickfienberg
 
 51823 Rickhusband
 
 
 
 
 
 
 
 
 1514 Ricouxa
 
 
 
 
 1025 Riema
 
 
 
 
 
 
 
 1796 Riga
 
 
 
 
 
 
 
 15415 Rika
 
 
 
 
 
 
 
 
 
 
 
 
 
 
 
 
 
 
 
 
 
 
 
 
 
 
 
 
 
 
 4090 Říšehvězd
 
 
 
 
 
 1180 Rita
 
 
 
 
 
 
 
 
 
 
 
 
 
 1426 Riviera
 
 
 
 
 
 
 
 
 
 
 
 
 
 
 
 
 
 
 1145 Robelmonte
 
 
 
 335 Roberta
 
 
 
 
 
 
 
 
 
 
 
 
 
 
 
 
 
 
 
 
 
 
 
 
 
 
 
 
 
 
 
 
 
 
 
 
 
 
 
 
 
 
 
 
 
 3428 Roberts
 
 
 
 
 
 
 
 
 
 
 
 2328 Robeson
 
 
 6312 Robheinlein
 
 
 
 
 
 
 
 
 
 
 
 
 
 
 
 
 
 
 
 
 
 
 
 
 
 
 
 
 
 
 
 
 
 
 
 
 
 
 904 Rockefellia
 
 
 
 
 
 
 4659 Roddenberry
 3873 Roddy
 
 
 
 
 
 
 
 
 
 
 
 
 
 1657 Roemera
 
 
 
 
 
 
 
 
 
 
 
 
 
 920 Rogeria
 
 
 
 
 
 
 
 
 
 
 
 
 
 
 
 
 
 
 
 
 
 
 
 2058 Róka
 
 
 
 
 
 
 
 
 
 
 
 1269 Rollandia
 19383 Rolling Stones
 472 Roma
 
 
 
 
 
 
 
 
 
 
 
 
 
 
 
 
 
 
 942 Romilda
 
 
 
 2285 Ron Helin
 
 
 
 
 
 
 
 
 
 
 
 
 
 
 
 
 
 
 
 
 
 
 223 Rosa
 
 
 314 Rosalia
 
 900 Rosalinde
 
 540 Rosamunde
 
 284996 Rosaparks
 
 
 
 
 
 
 
 
 
 
 
 
 
 
 
 100268 Rosenthal
 
 
 
 
 
 
 985 Rosina
 
 
 
 
 
 
 
 1646 Rosseland
 1350 Rosselia
 
 
 
 
 
 
 
 
 
 
 
 
 615 Roswitha
 
 
 
 
 
 
 
 
 
 874 Rotraut
 
 
 
 
 
 
 
 
 
 1518 Rovaniemi
 
 
 
 
 
 
 
 
 317 Roxane
 
 
 
 
 
 5208 Royer
 
 
 
 
 
 
 
 
 
 6267 Rozhen
 
 
 
 
 
 
 
 
 
 
 
 
 
 
 
 
 
 
 
 9921 Rubincam
 
 
 
 
 
 
 
 
 
 
 
 
 
 
 
 1907 Rudneva
 
 
 
 
 
 
 
 2629 Rudra
 
 
 
 
 
 
 
 
 
 
 
 
 
 
 
 
 
 
 
 
 
 
 
 
 
 
 
 
 
 
 
 353 Ruperto-Carola
 1953 Rupertwildt
 1443 Ruppina
 
 
 
 
 
 
 
 
 
 1762 Russell
 
 
 
 
 
 
 
 
 
 232 Russia
 
 
 1171 Rusthawelia
 
 
 
 
 
 
 
 798 Ruth
 
 
 
 
 1249 Rutherfordia
 
 2518 Rutllant
 
 
 
 1856 Růžena
 
 
 
 
 
 
 
 
 
 
 
 
 
 
 
 
 
 
 
 
 
 
 
 
 
 
 
 
 
 
 
 162173 Ryugu

See also 
 List of minor planet discoverers
 List of observatory codes

References 
 

Lists of minor planets by name